Graham Douglas Perrett (born 5 January 1966) is an Australian politician who has been a member of the House of Representatives since 2007, representing the Queensland seat of Moreton for the Australian Labor Party (ALP). He worked as a schoolteacher, solicitor, and political staffer before entering parliament.

Early life
Perrett was born in St George in Queensland in 1966 (seventh child in a family of ten children), and received a diploma of teaching in 1985. He taught for three years in schools on the Darling Downs and Far North Queensland, then another eight years in Brisbane.

In 1993, Perrett completed a BA (Hons) through the University of Queensland. His thesis was a study of The Autobiography of Malcolm X. He later received an LL.B. from Queensland University of Technology in 1999. He worked as a solicitor of the Supreme Court of Queensland from 1999 to 2005 in Quinn & Scattini. After working with the Queensland Independent Education Union as an organiser he was given a role as a senior policy adviser to the Premier of Queensland, Peter Beattie, in 2005, and later for the Minister for Health, Stephen Robertson.

Politics
Perrett ran unsuccessfully for the federal seat of Moreton in 2004. He was elected to Moreton at the 2007 election where he ended Gary Hardgrave's 11-year term in office with a 7.6-point swing. Perrett described the victory as surprising, stating "In my wildest dreams I certainly didn't expect that the seat would be decided as early as it was". Perrett claimed the victory, over a former multicultural affairs minister, could be put down to the fact that "people are ready for hope and aren't prepared to stick with the tired old fear factor of John Howard".

In the 2007 Moreton campaign Perrett's rival, Gary Hardgrave, complained of being branded a "racist", after the standing member said that Moreton was being "exhausted" by the influx of African refugees. Perrett campaigned primarily on issues relating to health and education in the lead up to the election, whilst Hardgrave focused primarily on roads, according to a radio interview.

Perrett was appointed as a Government Whip in May 2013, holding the position until Labor's defeat at the 2013 election. He was appointed as a shadow parliamentary secretary in Bill Shorten's shadow ministry in May 2014, and retained the position under Anthony Albanese when he replaced Shorten as leader in June 2019.

Personal life
Perrett published his first novel, The Twelfth Fish, in October 2008. The sex scenes in The Twelfth Fish drew attention from the political class and the media. In the lead-up to the 2010 federal election a Christian group put out a flyer calling Perrett the "Member for Porn". He retained his seat and went on to publish a sequel in September 2013, The Big Fig.

In his teaching days Perrett played in a band called Once I Killed a Gopher with a Stick and remains a keen fan of music and literature. He enjoys writing and bushwalking.

Perrett attracted international attention and ridicule after tweeting about facial injuries he suffered while watching an episode of political satire Veep. Perrett suffered a black eye and received three stitches in his cheek after knocking himself unconscious.

Perrett lives in Moorooka, Queensland with his wife Lea and has two sons.

References

 

Australian Labor Party members of the Parliament of Australia
Members of the Australian House of Representatives for Moreton
Members of the Australian House of Representatives
Queensland University of Technology alumni
1966 births
Living people
Labor Left politicians
21st-century Australian politicians
21st-century Australian novelists
University of Queensland alumni
Australian solicitors